The 1979 Kent State Golden Flashes football team was an American football team that represented Kent State University  in the Mid-American Conference (MAC) during the 1979 NCAA Division I-A football season. In their second season under head coach Ron Blackledge, the Golden Flashes compiled a 1–10 record (1–8 against MAC opponents), finished in tenth place in the MAC, and were outscored by all opponents by a combined total of 298 to 127.

The team's statistical leaders included J.C. Stafford with 497 rushing yards, Jeff Morrow with 1,284 passing yards, and Mike Moore with 334 receiving yards. Punter Jeff Morrow was selected as a first-team All-MAC player.

Schedule

References

Kent State
Kent State Golden Flashes football seasons
Kent State Golden Flashes football